Jack Fidler (29 September 1905 – 1 October 1991) was an  Australian rules footballer who played with St Kilda in the Victorian Football League (VFL).

Notes

External links 

1905 births
1991 deaths
Australian rules footballers from Victoria (Australia)
St Kilda Football Club players